The 1st season of The Bachelor premiered on September 10, 2020 on Alpha TV. This season featured the first greek bachelor, 30-year-old Panagiotis Vasilakos from Mani, a real estate manager, is a graduate of Physical Education and has been professionally involved in football having played in teams in Greece and abroad.

He has participated on the first season of the reality competition Nomads. On episode 15 he left the show for personal reasons. By participating in "The Bachelor" he wants to take the next step in his personal life and meet the woman of his dreams. The one who will "steal" his mind, heart and conquer him with her character and personality.

Contestants
In the first week 20 women entered the game. In the seventh week one new woman (Anna) entered the game, bringing the total number of women to 21. Stella as the new woman entered the game in the ninth week, with the number of women being 22.

Call-out order

 The contestant received a first impression rose
 The contestant received a rose during the date
 The contestant was eliminated
 The contestant was eliminated during the date
 The contestant was given a rose at the Rose Ceremony and rejected it
 The contestant quit the competition
 The contestant won the competition

Notes

Episodes

Week 1

Episode 1
Original airdate: 
First impression rose: Rafaela
Eliminated in Rose ceremony: Alexandra & Vasiliki

Week 2

Episode 2
Original airdate: 
Single date: Sia
Group date: Magdalene, Nicoletta, Erietta, Rafaela, Vivian, Marievi, Anastasia, Christina, Angelina, Marina
One-on-One Time: Nicoletta

Episode 3
Original airdate: 
Group date: Marievi, Cassiani, Christina, Samantha, Angelina, Elena, Vivian, Marina, Annie, Nicoleta
One-on-One Time: Marina
Single date: Marievi
Eliminated in Rose ceremony: Katerina

Week 3

Episode 4
Original airdate: 
Group date: Magda, Angelina, Sia, Marina, Elena, Anastasia, Cassiani, Erietta, Daria, Samantha
One-on-One Time: Anastasia
Single date: Magdalene

Episode 5
Original airdate: 
Group date: Angelina, Marina, Christina, Erietta, Marievi, Cassiani, Vivian
One-on-One Time: Angelina
Single date: Angelina

Episode 6
Original airdate: 
Group date: Vivian, Magda, Sia, Nicoletta, Annie, Anastasia, Rafaela, Samantha, Erietta, Magdalene
Single date: Elena
Eliminated in Rose ceremony: Cassiani

Week 4

Episode 7
Original airdate: 
Group date: Marievi, Christina, Rafaela, Vivian, Marina, Nicoletta, Annie, Elena, Magda, Anastasia
Received a white rose: Nicoletta
Single date: Vivian

Episode 8
Original airdate: 
Two-on-One Time: Annie, Magda
Eliminated in Two-on-One Date: Magda
Group date: Angelina, Samantha, Christina, Marina, Erietta, Vivian, Anastasia, Nicoletta
One-on-One Time: Samantha

Episode 9
Original airdate: 
Group date: Anastasia, Samantha, Rafaela, Christina, Erietta, Vivian
One-on-One Time: Christina
Single date: Daria
Eliminated in Rose ceremony: Daria

Week 5

Episode 10
Original airdate: 
Single date: Angelina Nicoletta (because of the white rose)
Group date: Marina, Magdalene, Sia, Elena, Marievi, Christina, Rafaela
One-on-One Time: Marina

Episode 11
Original airdate: 
Single date: Sia
Group date: Rafaela, Anastasia, Christina, Magdalene, Samantha, Angelina, Vivian, Erietta
One-on-One Time: Rafaela

Episode 12
Original airdate: 
Group date: Elena, Nicoletta, Erietta, Angelina, Marina, Christina
One-on-One Time: Erietta
Single date: Marievi
Eliminated in Rose ceremony: Annie & Samantha

Week 6

Episode 13
Original airdate: 
Group date: Rafaela, Anastasia, Christina, Sia, Magdalene, Marina
Group date: Sia, Marina, Rafaela
One-on-One Time: Rafaela
Single date: Angelina

Episode 14
Original airdate: 
Two-on-One Time: Magdalene, Marievi
Eliminated in Two-on-One Date: Marievi
Group date: Nicoletta, Erietta, Sia, Vivian, Anastasia, Marina

Episode 15
Original airdate: 
Group date: Vivian, Anastasia, Angelina, Rafaela, Marina
Single date: Magdalene
Quit: Magdalene
Eliminated in Rose ceremony: Elena

Week 7

Episode 16
Original airdate: 
Group date: Erietta, Nicoletta, Marina, Christina, Angelina
One-on-One Time: Nicoletta
Single date: Marina

Episode 17
Original airdate: 
Group date: Sia, Rafaela, Vivian, Anastasia
Eliminated in Rose ceremony: Anastasia

Week 8

Episode 18
Original airdate: 
Group date: Anna, Marina, Vivian, Christina, Nicoletta, Erietta
One-on-One Time: Nicoletta
Single date: Erietta

Episode 19
Original airdate: 
Group date: Anna, Sia, Angelina, Marina
One-on-One Time: Anna
Two-on-One Time: Angelina, Christina
Eliminated in Rose ceremony: Christina

Week 9

Episode 20
Original airdate: 
Group date: Anna, Stella, Rafaela, Angelina
One-on-One Time: Anna

Episode 21
Original airdate: 
Single date: Rafaela
Single date: Stella
Quit: Marina

Week 10

Episode 22
Original airdate: 
Group date: Vivian, Angelina, Sia, Rafaela
One-on-One Time: Vivian
Single date: Nicoletta

Episode 23
Original airdate: 
Single date: Sia
Eliminated in Rose ceremony: Stella

Week 11

Episode 24
Original airdate: 
Meet Panagiotis's Friends: All the Girls
Group date: Erietta, Angelina, Vivian

Episode 25
Original airdate: 
Group date: Rafaela, Anna, Angelina, Vivian
One-on-One Time: Angelina
Eliminated in Rose ceremony: None

Week 12

Episode 26
Original airdate: 
A Night together with the Bachelor: Vivian
Single date: Nicoletta

Episode 27
Original airdate: 
Group date: Nicoletta, Sia, Erietta, Angelina
Single date: Angelina

Episode 28
Original airdate: 
Single date: Erietta
Eliminated in Rose ceremony: Anna

Week 13

Episode 29
Original airdate: 
Group date: All the Girls
Single date: Rafaela

Episode 30
Original airdate: 
Group date: Angelina, Rafaela, Vivian, Sia, Erietta
Single date: Angelina
Eliminated in Rose ceremony: Erietta

Week 14

Episode 31
Original airdate: 
Single date: Nicoletta

Episode 32
Original airdate: 
Single date: Rafaela
Eliminated in Rose ceremony: Sia

Week 15

Episode 33
Original airdate: 
Hometown #1: Vivian
Hometown #2: Nicoletta
Hometown #3: Angelina
Hometown #4: Rafaela
Eliminated in Rose ceremony: Rafaela

Episode 34
Original airdate: 
A whole day with the bachelor #1: Vivian
A whole day with the bachelor #2: Angelina
A whole day with the bachelor #3: Nicoletta
Eliminated in Rose ceremony: Angelina

Episode 35
Original airdate: 
Meet Panagiotis's Family #1: Vivian
Meet Panagiotis's Family #2: Nicoletta
Final Date #1: Vivian
Final Date #2: Nicoletta
Final Decision: 
Nicoletta is the winner
Vivian is the runner-up

Ratings

Note

  Outside top 20.
  Outside top 10.

References

External links
 Official website

2020 Greek television seasons
Greek (season 01)